The Shanghai–Jinshan Expressway, commonly referred to as the Hujin Expressway and designated S4, is an expressway in the city of Shanghai, China. It runs generally in a north-south direction from the Xinzhuang Interchange, a large interchange with the Outer Ring Expressway, the G60 Shanghai–Kunming Expressway, the G92 Hangzhou Bay Ring Expressway, and Humin Elevated Road in Minhang District to Jinshan District, ending at an interchange with the G15 Shenyang–Haikou Expressway. The expressway is tolled south of the Zhuanqiao Service Area in Minhang District, between the exits to Yindu Road and the Shanghai–Jiaxing–Huzhou Expressway.

Before August 2009, the expressway was known as the A4 Expressway.

List of exits and interchanges

 Interchange with S20 Outer Ring Expressway, Humin Elevated Road, G320 Humin Highway and G60 Shanghai–Kunming Expressway
 X220 Xinzhu Road - northbound entrance only from westbound, southbound exit only to westbound
 X228 Chunshen Road
 X231 Yindu Road - northbound entrance only from westbound, southbound exit only to westbound
 Shanghai–Jiaxing–Huzhou Expressway
 S323 Jianchuan Road
 X421 Xizha Highway - northbound entrance only from westbound, southbound exit only to westbound
 S324 Daye Highway
 S306 Tuannan Highway and Nianfeng Road
 Interchange with G1501 Shanghai Ring Expressway
 X431 Haiwan Road
 North Muhua Road - to Shanghai Chemical Industries Zone
 X262 Zhuanghu Highway
 Interchange with G15 Shenyang–Haikou Expressway and exit to X250 Tingwei Highway

References

Expressways in Shanghai